Paroreia or Paroria (Παρωρία) was a town of ancient Arcadia, Greece, in the region of Eutresia. It was located near the present village Trilofo, in the municipal unit of Megalopoli. According to Greek mythology, Paroreia was founded by Paroreus (Παρωρεὺς), a son of Tricolonus. It was 10 stades from Zoetia, and 15 stades from Thyraeum. It was already abandoned when Pausanias visited the area in the 2nd century.

See also
List of Ancient Greek cities

References

Populated places in ancient Arcadia
Former populated places in Greece